"Charm" is a song by Canadian pop rock group The Philosopher Kings. Released in March 1995 as the third single from their self-titled debut album it reached number 16 in Canada and peaked at number 36 on the US Mainstream Top 40.

Lenny DeRose won the Juno Award for Best Recording Engineer at the Juno Awards of 1995 for his work on "Charms" and "Lay My Body Down".

A dance remix of the song by the Boomtang Boys was also released.

Charts

References

1995 songs
Canadian pop songs
Canadian rhythm and blues songs